The Wisconsin Ethics Commission is a regulatory agency of the State of Wisconsin which administers and enforces Wisconsin law pertaining to ethics and lobbying.

Membership
The Commission is made up of six members, two of whom are appointed by the Governor of Wisconsin, and one each by the President of the Senate, the Senate Majority Leader, the Speaker of the Assembly, and the Assembly Minority Leader.

The staff of the Commission are non-partisan, and are led by an administrator. The administrator is appointed by the commission and must be confirmed by the Wisconsin Senate.

Current commissioners

History
The Wisconsin Ethics Commission was created in 2015 when Governor Scott Walker signed Wisconsin Act 118, which eliminated the Wisconsin Government Accountability Board effective June 30, 2016.

References

External links
Official website
Ethics commissions
Government of Wisconsin
Politics of Wisconsin
2015 establishments in Wisconsin